The Cambridge Greensand is a geological unit in England whose strata are earliest Cenomanian in age. It lies above the erosive contact between the Gault Formation and the Chalk Group in the vicinity of Cambridgeshire, and technically forms the lowest member bed of the West Melbury Marly Chalk Formation. It is a remanié deposit, containing reworked fossils of late Albian age, including those of dinosaurs and pterosaurs.

Description 
The lithology is made out of glauconitic marl, described as a "chalk mud", containing abundant ostracod, coccolith and foram remains, with a concentration of phosphatic nodules and bones at the base.

Vertebrate paleofauna

Birds 
 Enaliornis barrette - "Braincases, vertebrae, pelvis [and] limb elements.."
 E sedgwicki - "Hindlimb elements."
 E. seeleyi - "Assorted cranial and postcranial elements"

Dinosaurs

Ornithischians 
 Anoplosaurus curtonotus - "Partial postcranium."
 A. major - "Cervical vertebrae." "Vertebrae."
 Acanthopholis eucercus - "[Two] caudal centra."
 Acanthopholis platypus (in part) - "Phalanx, caudal centra."
 Acanthopholis macrocercus (aka Syngonosaurus) - "Osteoderms." "Vertebrae, fragmentary skeleton elements."
 Acanthopholis stereocercus - "Osteoderms." "Vertebrae."
 Eucercosaurus tanyspondylus - "Vertebrae."
 Trachodon cantabrigiensis - "Dentary tooth."

Saurischians 
 Macrurosaurus semnus - "Caudal vertebrae"

Pterosaurs 
 Amblydectes crassidens
 A. eurygnathus
 Camposipterus colorhinus
 C. nasutus
 Camposipterus sedgwickii
 Draigwenia platystomus
 Lonchodraco machaerorhynchus
 Lonchodraco microdon
 Ornithocheirus simus
 Nicorhynchus capito
 "Ornithocheirus" denticulatus
 "Ornithocheirus" polyodon
 Ornithostoma sedgwicki

Ichthyosaurs 
 Cetarthrosaurus walkeri
 Maiaspondylus cantabrigiensis (originally Ophthalmosaurus)
 Pervushovisaurus campylodon
 Sisteronia seeleyi

Lepidosauria 
 Patricosaurus merocratus

Invertebrates

Ammonites 
 Salaziceras (Salaziceras) salazacense

See also 
 List of dinosaur-bearing rock formations

References 

Geologic formations of England
Upper Cretaceous Series of Europe
Cenomanian Stage
Cretaceous England
Marl formations
Paleontology in England